SS Vaterland may refer to one of the following Hamburg America Line ships:

 , a  ocean liner; seized by the United States in World War I and renamed Leviathan
 , an incomplete ship destroyed by Allied bombers in 1943

See also 

Ship names